IAds or IADS may stand for:

Organisations and businesses 
International Association of Department Stores, a trade organisation dedicated to this retail format

Technology
iAd, a mobile advertising service operated by Apple Inc.